Lichtenberg is an isolated lunar impact crater located in the western part of the Oceanus Procellarum. The nearest crater of note is Briggs to the south.

Lichtenberg has a small system of rays, a characteristic of Copernican age craters. The rays extend to the north and west of the crater but not elsewhere. The remaining flanks of the surface about the crater exhibit the low albedo of the lunar mare, and the mare deposits have overlaid the existing rays on the east and south sides of the crater. These are thus among the youngest deposits of basaltic lava on the Moon, and are believed to be less than 1 billion years in age.  However, the most recent lunar geologic map (2020) does not show the mare next to Lichtenberg as being Copernican in age - it is mapped as Upper Imbrian.

Lunar scientist Paul Spudis advocates an unmanned sample-return mission to the young mare to obtain an absolute radiometric date that would constrain the time period of the formation of the maria on the moon.

The rim of this crater is circular and sharp-edged, with negligible wear. On the inner sides the loose material has slid to the base, forming a ring of scree about the interior floor. Both the rim and the interior floor exhibit a relatively high albedo, which is usually an indication of a younger crater that has not been darkened by space weathering. Lichtenberg overlies a larger, ring-shaped ghost crater to the northwest, which has a low central rise. This feature is covered by ray material.

Lichtenberg has been noted in the past for occurrences of transient lunar phenomenon. These typically take the form of a temporary, red-hued patch.

Satellite craters
By convention these features are identified on lunar maps by placing the letter on the side of the crater midpoint that is closest to Lichtenberg.

The following craters have been renamed by the IAU.
 Lichtenberg G — See Humason (crater).

References

External links

Impact craters on the Moon